Royal Air Force Inverness or RAF Inverness was a Royal Air Force station located by the Moray Firth in Highland, Scotland. It was also known as RAF Longman and previously Longman Airfield.

History

Longman Airfield was built in 1933 by the local council as a civilian airport for Highland Airways to link Orkney and Wick to Inverness and its major rail links. The airfield was converted to a Royal Air Force base at the Outbreak of World War II, but didn't officially become an RAF base until 1941. The airfield was identified by German reconnaissance units which incorrectly noted it as a seaplane base, which probably saved Inverness from any major bombing by the Luftwaffe.

During the war, Scottish Airways, the successor to Highland Airways, continued to use the airfield for intensive civilian operations supporting the Orkney and Shetland Isles.

Under the command of No. 13 (Fighter) Group, it hosted No. 70 (Signals) Wing Calibration Flight between 17 February 1941 and 25 August 1945.

Operational Squadrons & Aircraft

Other units
 No. 14 Group Target Towing Flight RAF (October – November 1941) became No. 1491 (Target Towing) Flight RAF (December 1941)
 No. 1 (Coastal) Engine Control Demonstration Unit RAF (October – November 1943)
 No. 1 Radio Servicing Section Calibration Flight RAF (November 1940 – February 1941) became No. 70 Wing Calibration Flight RAF (February 1941 – June 1943)
 No. 13 Group Communication Flight RAF (July 1943 – December 1945)
 No. 14 Group Communication Flight RAF (July 1940 – July 1943)
 Detachment of No. 1479 (Anti-Aircraft Cooperation) Flight RAF (August & November 1943)

Following the war it was converted to general use under the title Longman Airfield until Inverness Airport at Dalcross became the primary hub in 1947, due to Longman being regarded as too small for safe operations. Prior to its closure, it was served by British European Airways, and its fleet of captured ex-Luftwaffe Junkers Ju 52. It is believed that for some time Hitler's personal Ju 52 (registration D-2600) was stored at Longman after the war.

References

Citations

Bibliography

Royal Air Force stations in Scotland
Military airbases established in 1940